Roger Pearson may refer to:

Roger Pearson (anthropologist) (1927–2023), British anthropologist and political organizer
Roger Pearson (literary scholar), professor of French at Oxford University